The Committee of Privileges (Malay: Jawatankuasa Hak dan Kebebasan) is a select committee of the House of Representatives in the Parliament of Malaysia. The committee is headed by the Speaker, and six members appointed by the Committee of Selection at the beginning of each Parliament. It is responsible for considering matters concerning the Houses of Representatives.

The committee is responsible for matters pertaining to the parliament while it is in session. Any members of parliament can notify the Speaker on matters that affects the privileges accorded to Parliament, of which requires the Speaker's approval before being handed to the committee, where they will issue a statement on the matter.

Membership

14th Parliament
As of April 2021, the member of the committee are as follows:

Up to December 2019, the members of the committee are as follows:

Former members of the committee are as follows:

See also
Parliamentary Committees of Malaysia

Notes

References

External links
THE COMMITTEE OF PRIVILEGES

Parliament of Malaysia
Committees of the Parliament of Malaysia
Committees of the Dewan Rakyat